Urban cluster may refer to:
 Urban cluster (UC) in the US census. See List of United States urban areas
 Urban cluster (France), a statistical area defined by France's national statistics office
 City cluster, mainly in Chinese English, synonymous with megalopolis